Secretary is a 2002 American erotic romantic comedy-drama film directed by Steven Shainberg from a screenplay by Erin Cressida Wilson, based on the 1988 short story of the same name by Mary Gaitskill. Starring Maggie Gyllenhaal and James Spader, the film explores the intense relationship between a dominant lawyer and his submissive secretary, who indulge in various types of BDSM activities such as erotic spanking and petplay.

Plot
Lee Holloway is the socially awkward and emotionally sensitive youngest daughter of a dysfunctional family. She adjusts to normal life after having been committed to a mental hospital following an incident of severe self-harm.

Lee learns to type and applies for a job as a secretary for an eccentric yet demanding attorney, E. Edward Grey. Grey explains she is overqualified for the job (having scored higher than anyone he has ever interviewed) and that it is "very dull work" as they only use typewriters; Lee, however, agrees to work under these conditions.

Though at first Grey appears to be highly irritated by Lee's typos and other mistakes, it soon becomes apparent that he is sexually aroused by her obedient behavior. When Grey discovers her propensity for self-harm, he confronts her and commands that she never hurt herself again.

The two soon embark on a BDSM relationship from their typical employer–employee relationship. However, Lee experiences a sexual and personal awakening through the sadomasochistic sexual encounters with Grey, and she falls deeply in love with him. Conversely, Grey displays insecurity concerning his feelings for Lee, as well as shame and disgust over his sexual habits.

During this period of exploration with Grey, Lee has also been attempting to have a more conventional boyfriend in Peter, even engaging in lukewarm sex with him. After a sexual encounter in Grey's office, Grey fires Lee.

Peter then proposes to Lee, who reluctantly agrees to marry him. However, while trying on her wedding gown, she leaves and runs to Grey's office to declare her love for him.

Grey, still uncertain about their relationship, tests Lee by commanding her to sit in his chair without moving her hands or feet until he returns. Lee willingly complies, despite being forced to wet her dress since she is not allowed to use the toilet.

Hours pass, as several family members and acquaintances individually visit Lee to alternately attempt to dissuade or encourage her while Grey watches from afar, completely taken by Lee's compliance. Her refusal to leave the office draws the attention of the media, which they believe to be a hunger strike.

Three days later, Grey returns to the office and takes Lee to a room upstairs where he bathes and feeds her. The pair marry and happily continue their dominant–submissive relationship.

Cast

Production
Many changes were made from Mary Gaitskill's original short story, which was significantly expanded and given greater depth to be made into a feature-length film. Lines of dialogue were changed; Lee's statement "I'm so stupid" became the fantasy-sequence cry "I'm your secretary", which the director thought far more "celebratory". Additionally, the ending of the story was changed to give a more positive outcome to the relationship. Steven Shainberg stated that he wished to show that BDSM relationships can be normal and was inspired by the film My Beautiful Laundrette, which he feels normalized gay relationships for audiences in the 1980s.

A central component to the film, the office spaces of Edward and Lee, took form after two years of planning by Shainberg and production designer Amy Danger, who had collaborated with Shainberg on several projects. The desire to have the office feel homemade and express Edward's interest in the growing of plants led Danger to juxtapose a natural decor in the office with a predominantly artificial outside world. Speaking of her choices, Danger compares the office with the rest of the film's locations: "All the materials I used [in the office] were natural: natural wood, bamboo, ironwork ... If I wasn't using natural materials, it was natural colors, like [in] the botanical wallpaper."  In contrast, "everything [in the larger world] was fake ... I covered Lee's house in plastic sheeting, and used artificial, manufactured colors."
Although the interior sets were carefully constructed, the filmmakers did face some location-related challenges. Notably, in one instance the filmmakers accidentally obtained shooting rights for the wrong park. Gyllenhaal encouraged them to hastily shoot the required park scene anyway, without permission, while crew members distracted the local police.

Speaking about Secretarys tone and atmosphere, Danger says "With this S&M material, we could go into a dark place... Steve and I wanted the total opposite: that the nature of this relationship freed [the characters] to be their natural selves." Because of this atmosphere, Danger says "Everybody kept saying, 'When are we going back to the office?' It was funny, because the rooms weren't any smaller in the house, and it wasn't any more difficult to shoot. It was because you wanted to be in that space."

Filming 
Despite being set in Florida, filming took place in Los Angeles.

Release

Theatrical
The film premiered at the 2002 Sundance Film Festival, where it won a Special Jury Prize Award for Originality for Steven Shainberg. It was subsequently acquired by Lionsgate Films for theatrical release. It also went on to screen at the Toronto International Film Festival later that year. The film opened in limited release on September 20, 2002, as well as in various foreign markets in 2003 and 2004.

Home media
The film's region 1 DVD was released on April 1, 2003. In the UK, a version by Tartan Video was released on January 5, 2004, followed by a budget edition by Prism Leisure on February 7, 2005. A Blu-ray Disc was released on October 4, 2010.

Special features on the Blu-ray include the film's trailer and TV spots, cast and director interviews, a behind-the-scenes documentary, cast and director "Curricula Vitae" and an audio commentary by director Steven Shainberg and writer Erin Cressida Wilson.

Reception

Critical response
On the review aggregator website Rotten Tomatoes, the film holds an approval rating of 78% based on 157 reviews, with an average rating of 6.8/10. The website's critics consensus states, "Maggie Gyllenhaal impresses in this romantic comedy with a kinky twist." Many critics noted the film's original take on themes of sadomasochism, with Roger Ebert saying that the film "approaches the tricky subject ... with a stealthy tread, avoiding the dangers of making it either too offensive, or too funny". Ain't It Cool News commented: "Perhaps there is something bold about saying that pain can bring healing as long as it's applied by the right hand, but even that seems obvious and even normal thanks to Gyllenhaal."

Box office
The film grossed $4.1 million in the U.S and Canada, and $9.3 million worldwide.

Controversy 
The film's exploration of a BDSM romantic relationship and Spader's character bearing the last name "Grey" have drawn comparisons to the 50 Shades of Grey franchise, with some suspecting the former inspired the E.L. James series.

In the Discovery+ documentary series House of Hammer, it is alleged that Secretary was a favorite film of actor Armie Hammer. Hammer allegedly screened the film for Courtney Vucekovich, one of the numerous women to come forward with sexual abuse allegations against the former actor.

Accolades
Secretary was nominated for a number of awards and won several, with numerous wins for Maggie Gyllenhaal's breakthrough performance.

Soundtrack
The film's soundtrack album was released on CD on October 8, 2002, with an MP3 download version released on July 11, 2006. The soundtrack album contains Angelo Badalamenti's score as well as two songs that were notably featured over erotic montages in the film: Leonard Cohen's "I'm Your Man" and Lizzie West's "Chariots Rise".

The song "Chariots Rise" was changed slightly for the film, with the lyric "what a fool am I, to fall so in love" changed to "what grace have I, to fall so in love".

 Track listing
All tracks by Angelo Badalamenti unless otherwise stated.

 "I'm Your Man" – Leonard Cohen
 "Main Title"
 "Feelin' Free"
 "Snow Dome Dreams"
 "Bathing Blossom"
 "Seeing Scars"
 "Loving to Obey"
 "Office Obligations"
 "The Loving Tree"
 "Orchids"
 "Secretary's Secrets"
 "Chariots Rise" – Lizzie West

See also
 Sadism and masochism in fiction
 Nudity in film

Notes

References

Further reading

External links
 
 
 

2002 films
2002 independent films
2002 romantic comedy-drama films
2000s American films
2000s English-language films
2000s erotic drama films
2000s sex comedy films
American erotic drama films
American erotic romance films
American independent films
American romantic comedy-drama films
American sex comedy films
BDSM in films
Films about dysfunctional families
Films about self-harm
Films based on American short stories
Films directed by Steven Shainberg
Films scored by Angelo Badalamenti
Films set in Florida
Films shot in Los Angeles
Lionsgate films
Workplace comedy films